The Office of the Secretary of Defense (OSD) is a headquarters-level staff of the United States Department of Defense. It is the principal civilian staff element of the U.S. Secretary of Defense, and it assists the Secretary in carrying out authority, direction and control of the Department of Defense in the exercise of policy development, planning, resource management, fiscal, and program evaluation responsibilities. OSD (along with the Joint Staff) is the Secretary of Defense's support staff for managing the Department of Defense, and it corresponds to what the Executive Office of the President of the U.S. is to the U.S. president for managing the whole of the Executive branch of the federal government.

OSD includes the immediate offices of the Secretary (SECDEF) and the Deputy Secretary of Defense (DEPSECDEF), as well as the Under Secretary of Defense for Research and Engineering; Under Secretary of Defense for Acquisition and Sustainment; Under Secretary of Defense for Policy; Under Secretary of Defense (Comptroller); Under Secretary of Defense for Personnel and Readiness; and Under Secretary of Defense for Intelligence & Security. All of these positions are Presidential appointments which require U.S. Senate confirmation, as do each of their sole deputies.

Other positions include the Assistant Secretaries of Defense, Assistants to the Secretary of Defense, General Counsel, Director, Operational Test and Evaluation, Director of Administration and Management, and other staff offices that the Secretary establishes in order to assist in carrying out their assigned responsibilities.

Composition of OSD

The Secretary and Deputy Secretary manage several Under Secretaries each of whom in turn manage several Assistant Secretaries of Defense. There are also several special officers reporting directly to the Secretary of Defense.

Major elements of OSD (listed hierarchically):

 Secretary of Defense (SecDef) and Deputy Secretary of Defense (DepSecDef)
 Special officers reporting directly to Secretary and Deputy
 Executive Secretary of the Department of Defense (ExecSec)
 General Counsel of the Department of Defense
 Assistant to the Secretary of Defense for Intelligence Oversight (ATSD(IO))
 Assistant to the Secretary of Defense for Public Affairs (ATSD(PA))
 Chief Information Officer (DoD CIO)
 Senior Designated Officials of SECDEF-Empowered Cross Functional Teams
 Assistant Secretaries reporting directly to Secretary and Deputy
 Assistant Secretary of Defense for Legislative Affairs (LA)
 Under Secretaries
 Under Secretary of Defense (Comptroller)/Chief Financial Officer (C/CFO)
 Under Secretary of Defense for Acquisition and Sustainment (A&S)
 Deputy Under Secretary of Defense for Acquisition and Sustainment
 Assistant Secretary of Defense for Acquisition
 Assistant Secretary of Defense for Sustainment
 Assistant Secretary of Defense for Energy, Installations, and Environment
 Assistant Secretary of Defense for Nuclear, Chemical & Biological Defense Programs (NCB)
 Under Secretary of Defense for Intelligence and Security (I&S)
 Under Secretary of Defense for Personnel and Readiness (P&R)
 Deputy Under Secretary of Defense for Personnel and Readiness
 Assistant Secretary of Defense for Health Affairs (HA)
 Assistant Secretary of Defense for Manpower and Reserve Affairs (M&RA)
 Assistant Secretary of Defense for Readiness
 Executive Director, Defense Human Resources Activity (DHRA)
 Executive Director, Force Resiliency
 Executive Director, Personnel and Readiness
 Under Secretary of Defense for Policy (P)
 Deputy Under Secretary of Defense for Policy
 Assistant Secretary of Defense for Indo-Pacific Security Affairs (IPSA)
 Assistant Secretary of Defense for Global Strategic Affairs (GSA)
 Assistant Secretary of Defense for Homeland Defense and Hemispheric Affairs (HD&HA)
 Assistant Secretary of Defense for International Security Affairs (ISA)
 Assistant Secretary of Defense for Special Operations and Low Intensity Conflict (SO&LIC)
 Assistant Secretary of Defense for Space Policy
 Assistant Secretary of Defense for Strategy, Plans, and Capabilities 
 Under Secretary of Defense for Research and Engineering
 Directors
 Director of Administration and Management (DA&M)
 Director of Cost Assessment and Program Evaluation (CAPE)
 Director of Family Policy
 Director of Force Transformation
 Director of Net Assessment
 Director of the Office of Corrosion Policy and Oversight
 Director, Operational Test and Evaluation (DOT&E)
 Director of Small Business Programs

Former elements 
 Assistant Secretary of Defense for Networks and Information Integration (NII)
 Defense Prisoner of War/Missing Personnel Office (DPMO)

Major reorganizations

The composition of OSD is in a state of consistent flux, as Congress and DoD routinely create new offices, redesignate existing ones, and abolish others.

Obama administration changes
During the Obama administration, Congress has sought to clarify the organization of OSD, and has worked with the department to move toward a standardization of official naming conventions. Many Defense officials, including the Deputy Secretary of Defense (DEPSECDEF), all five Under Secretaries of Defense (USDs), and all Assistant Secretaries of Defense (ASDs), as well as any officials specifically designated in U.S. Code have historically been considered Presidentially-Appointed, Senate-Confirmed (PAS) officials, in that the Senate must provide "advice and consent" for each individual before he or she can operate in an official capacity. In a March 2009 letter, Senator Carl Levin, Chairman of the Senate Armed Service Committee, wrote that the department was apparently exercising the authority to appoint other significant officials—termed Deputy Under Secretaries of Defense (DUSDs)—"without statutory authorization, without limitation, and without Senate confirmation." Levin was "concerned that the proliferation of DUSDs at multiple levels of the organization could muddy lines of authority and may not be in the best interest of the Department of Defense." Subsequent legislation established five Senate-confirmed Principal Deputies (i.e., "first assistants"), one for each Under Secretary of Defense.

The FY10 NDAA gave the Department of Defense until January 1, 2011, to eliminate or redesignate all other Deputy Under Secretaries who are not Principal Deputy Under Secretaries of Defense (PDUSDs). The FY11 NDAA extended this deadline to January 1, 2015. During that time, the Secretary may, at his or her discretion, appoint within OSD five additional non-PAS DUSDs beyond the five statutory PAS-PDUSDs. The USD(I) appears to be maintaining at least three non-PAS DUSDs, although they have been renamed. The USD (AT&L) has maintained the non-PAS DUSD for Installations and Environment, though the FY11 NDAA recommended merging this post with the newly created ASD for Operational Energy Plans and Programs. The USD(P) has maintained a non-PAS DUSD for Strategy, Plans, and Forces, though the FY11 NDAA recommended eliminating this position.

Nevertheless, a number of positions have been redesignated or eliminated during the Obama administration, pursuant to statutory language contained in the National Defense Authorization Acts of FY10 and FY11. and subsequent internal DoD reports.

 Director for Defense Intelligence = DDI, DUSD = Deputy Under Secretary of Defense, ASD = Assistant Secretary of Defense, DASD = Deputy Assistant Secretary of Defense

See also
 The Air Staff
 Headquarters Marine Corps
 The Joint Staff
 Office of the Secretary of the Army
 Office of the Secretary of the Navy
 Office of the Secretary of the Air Force
 Secretary of Defense-Empowered Cross-Functional Teams

References

External links 
 Office of the Secretary of Defense
 Office of the Under Secretary of Defense for Acquisition, Technology and Logistics (AcqWeb)

1947 establishments in Virginia
Government agencies established in 1947
United States Department of Defense agencies